Laurie Thomassin (born 2 July 1978) is a French retired breaststroke swimmer who won a gold medal in the 4×100 m medley relay at the 2004 European Aquatics Championships. She also competed in the same event at the 2004 Summer Olympics.

More than one French sportswoman carries the name Laurie Thomassin: a pentathlon athlete Laurie Thomassin (b. 1986), and a younger swimmer who won a bronze medal in the 200 m breaststroke at the 12th Gymnasiade in 2002 (i.e. born after 1985).

References

External links 
 

1978 births
Living people
Olympic swimmers of France
Swimmers at the 2004 Summer Olympics
French female breaststroke swimmers
European Aquatics Championships medalists in swimming
Sportspeople from Nîmes